Chieri ’76 Volleyball is an Italian women's volleyball club based in Chieri and currently playing in the Serie A1.

Previous names
Due to sponsorship, the club have competed under the following names:
 Chieri '76 Carol's (2009–2015)
 Chieri '76 Volleyball (2015–2015)
 Fenera Chieri (2015–present)

History
As part of the  association, the club was officially established on 14 May 2009 and named after Chieri Volley (also known as Pallavolo Chieri and Chieri Torino). The origins of In Alto Chieri dates back from the late 1990s, when Chieri Volley, the traditional professional women's volleyball club of the town and InVolley, another local volleyball club, started a project on which Chieri focused on the professional team and InVolley on the youth teams. Soon after more local clubs joined in and the In Alto Chieri association was established in 2004. When the association acquired a Serie B2 licence and assets from Carol's Volley in 2009, the club was formed and named . The debut came in the 2009–10 Serie B2 and in the following season the club was promoted to Serie B1. At the end of the 2014–15 season, after four seasons in Serie B1, the club received a place in Serie A2 due to withdraw from other clubs.

On 8 June 2016, the In Alto Chieri association becomes the  consortium, with the club being one of its seven members which are all located in the South and South East of Turin. The consortium is designed to strength women's volleyball in the region by offering a channel where players can be developed from young age up to professional level locally.

Honours

International competitions

  CEV Challenge Cup: 1

Venue
The club play its home matches at the PalaMaddalene in Chieri. The venue has a 1,200 spectators capacity.

References

External links

 Official website 

Italian women's volleyball clubs
Volleyball clubs established in 2009
2009 establishments in Italy
Sport in Piedmont
Chieri